The 1957 Tangerine Bowl was an American college football bowl game played on January 1, 1957 at Tangerine Bowl in Orlando, Florida. The game pitted the Mississippi Southern Southerners (today's Southern Miss) and the West Texas State Buffaloes (now West Texas A&M).

Background
The Buffaloes finished 3rd in the Border Conference, but they still managed to get invited to the Tangerine Bowl, their second bowl appearance in seven seasons. The Southerners, an NCAA College Division independent, finished 7–1–1 while being invited to their third bowl game in four years.

Game summary
Mississippi Southern built a 13–0 halftime lead on a J.C. Arvan "Statue of Liberty" touchdown play from 51 yards out along with a 53-yard touchdown pass from Bobby Hughes to Jerry Taylor. However, Ron Mills intercepted an Eagle pass and returned it 75 yards for a touchdown to make it 13–6. Mills added a two-yard plunge to tie the game at 13. Quarterback Bubba Hillman rushed for 19 yards and the touchdown that proved to be the winning points for West Texas State.

Aftermath
The Southerners return to the next Tangerine Bowl a year later. The Buffaloes' next bowl game was the 1962 Sun Bowl.

References

Tangerine Bowl
Citrus Bowl (game)
Southern Miss Golden Eagles football bowl games
West Texas A&M Buffaloes football bowl games
Tangerine Bowl
Tangerine Bowl